The 1968 Minnesota Twins season was a season in American baseball. The team finished 79–83, seventh in the American League.

Offseason 
 January 27, 1968: Eric Soderholm was drafted by the Twins in the 1st round (1st pick) of the secondary phase of the 1968 Major League Baseball draft.

Regular season 
Leadoff batter César Tovar sparked the offense, finishing second in the AL with 167 hits and third with 89 runs. Tony Oliva was third in the AL with a .289 batting average. Harmon Killebrew had 17 HR and 40 RBI at the All-Star break, but was injured in the game and missed the second half of the season.

It took until their eighth season for the Twins to get no-hit and then it happened profoundly, as their first opposing no-hitter was the perfect game thrown by Oakland's Jim "Catfish" Hunter on May 8 in Oakland.  Hunter struck out eleven, and drove in three of his team's four runs.

A first for the Twins: on July 11, Rick Renick played his first-ever major league game, at shortstop.  In his first big-league at bat, he homered.  The run came off Detroit Tigers pitcher Mickey Lolich.  Renick is the first Twins player to accomplish the feat, later to be joined in history by Dave McKay (1975), Gary Gaetti (1981) and Andre David (1984). They all were then joined in 2015 by Eddie Rosario, who hit a homer not only in his first at bat, but on the first major-league pitch thrown to him.

Three Twins made the All-Star Game: first baseman Harmon Killebrew, second baseman Rod Carew, and outfielder Tony Oliva.

On September 22, utility player César Tovar played all nine positions, an inning each, against the Oakland Athletics.  Duplicating the feat that Bert Campaneris had performed three years prior, Tovar topped Campy by starting as pitcher and allowing no hits or runs, for a 0.00 earned run average.  In the inning, the first man to face Tovar was Campaneris, who fouled out.  Tovar then struck out slugger Reggie Jackson.

Four Twins won 10 or more games: Dean Chance (16–16), Jim Kaat (14–12) Jim Merritt (12–16), Dave Boswell (10–13). Pitcher Jim Kaat won his seventh Gold Glove.  Al Worthington led the American League with 18 saves.

1,143,257 fans attended Twins games, the fourth highest total in the American League.

Season standings

Record vs. opponents

Roster

Player stats

Batting

Starters by position 
Note: Pos = Position; G = Games played; AB = At bats; H = Hits; Avg. = Batting average; HR = Home runs; RBI = Runs batted in

Other batters 
Note: G = Games played; AB = At bats; H = Hits; Avg. = Batting average; HR = Home runs; RBI = Runs batted in

Pitching

Starting pitchers 
Note: G = Games pitched; IP = Innings pitched; W = Wins; L = Losses; ERA = Earned run average; SO = Strikeouts

Other pitchers 
Note: G = Games pitched; IP = Innings pitched; W = Wins; L = Losses; ERA = Earned run average; SO = Strikeouts

Relief pitchers 
Note: G = Games pitched; W = Wins; L = Losses; SV = Saves; ERA = Earned run average; SO = Strikeouts

Farm system 

LEAGUE CHAMPIONS: Orlando, St. Cloud

Notes

References 
Player stats from www.baseball-reference.com
Team info from www.baseball-almanac.com

Minnesota Twins seasons
Minnesota Twins season
Minnesota Twins